The Rejuvenation of Aunt Mary is a lost 1927 American silent comedy film starring veteran actress May Robson and released by Cecil B. DeMille's Producers Distributing Corporation (PDC).

Robson had first appeared in the Broadway play version of this story in 1907 when she was 49. In the film she returns to enact the same part 20 years later at the age of 69. A previous 1914 film version of the play had been produced minus May Robson.

Cast
 May Robson as Aunt Mary Watkins
 Harrison Ford as Jack Watkins
 Phyllis Haver as Martha Rankin
 Franklin Pangborn as Melville
 Robert Edeson as Judge Hopper
 Arthur Hoyt as Gus Watkins
 Betty Brown as Alma

See also
The Rejuvenation of Aunt Mary (1914)

References

External links

Cast and crew of the 1914 film The Rejuvenation of Aunt Mary
Posters to the film: Poster #1 and Poster #2
Lantern slide
Lantern slide
Lantern slide
Lantern slide
Lantern slide

1927 films
American silent feature films
Lost American films
1927 comedy films
American black-and-white films
Films directed by Erle C. Kenton
Silent American comedy films
Producers Distributing Corporation films
1927 lost films
Lost comedy films
1920s American films